Li Xiaodan (born 6 March 1990) is a Chinese table tennis player. Her highest career ITTF ranking was 33.

References

1990 births
Living people
Chinese female table tennis players